Martin Kinsley (June 2, 1754 – June 20, 1835) was a U.S. Representative from Massachusetts.  Born in Bridgewater in the Province of Massachusetts Bay, Kinsley graduated from Harvard College in 1778.  He studied medicine.  He became a purveyor of supplies in the Revolutionary Army.
He served as Treasurer of the Town of Hardwick.  He moved to Hampden, and was a representative of that town in the Massachusetts House of Representatives.  He served as member of the executive council in 1810 and 1811, as a judge of the court of common pleas in 1811, as judge of the probate court, and served in the Massachusetts State Senate.

Kinsley was elected as a Democratic-Republican to the Sixteenth Congress (March 4, 1819 – March 3, 1821).  He was an unsuccessful candidate for reelection in 1820 to the Seventeenth Congress.  He died in Roxbury, June 20, 1835.

References

1754 births
1835 deaths
Massachusetts state court judges
Massachusetts state senators
Members of the Massachusetts House of Representatives
Members of the Massachusetts Governor's Council
Harvard College alumni
People from Bridgewater, Massachusetts
Democratic-Republican Party members of the United States House of Representatives from Massachusetts
People from Hardwick, Massachusetts
People from Hampden, Massachusetts